Galaga may refer to:

Galaga video games based on "Galaxian" by Namco
Galaga (1981 arcade game), video game by Namco, sequel to Galaxian
Namco Galaga (1982 arcade hardware), Namco arcade game hardware
Galaga 3 (1984 arcade game), video game by Namco, sequel to Galaxian
Galaga '88 (1987 arcade game), video game by Namco, sequel to Galaga
Galaga: Destination Earth (2000 video game), video game from Hasbro by King of the Jungle, based on Galaga
Galaga 30th Collection (2011 computer game), video game by Namco Bandai based on Galaga

See also
Galaxian (disambiguation)